Market Rasen railway station serves the town of Market Rasen in Lincolnshire, England.

History

It was built by the Great Grimsby and Sheffield Junction Railway, with the opening of the line, in 1848. The station was a substantial structure with an overall roof below which all the usual station facilities could be found including a W. H. Smith bookstall. The station buildings are Grade II listed.

It is the only station now between Lincoln and Barnetby, but in the past there were many more (these mainly succumbed to the Beeching Axe in 1965). The signal box which was at the south end of the Lincoln platform was removed to Great Central Railway (heritage railway) at Quorn and re-erected in 1987.

Nowadays it is on the "Grimsby - Lincoln - Newark" line and is managed by East Midlands Railway.

Services

All services at Market Rasen are operated by East Midlands Railway using Class 156, 158 and 170 DMUs.

On Sundays, there is a limited summer service of three trains per day between Nottingham and Cleethorpes with no service during the winter months.

References

External links

Railway stations in Lincolnshire
DfT Category F1 stations
Former Great Central Railway stations
Railway stations in Great Britain opened in 1848
Railway stations served by East Midlands Railway
Grade II listed buildings in Lincolnshire
Market Rasen